Paredes is a city and a municipality in Porto District, in northern Portugal. The population in 2011 was 86,854, in an area of 156.76 km².

Currently, Paredes Municipality contains four cities: Paredes, Rebordosa, São Salvador de Lordelo and Gandra, being the Portuguese municipality with the most cities.

Paredes has a total of 18 parishes. The municipality is bordered on the north by the municipality of Paços de Ferreira, to the east by Lousada and Penafiel, to the southwest by Gondomar and to the west by Valongo. The municipality was created in 1836.

Demographics

Parishes
Administratively, the municipality is divided into 18 civil parishes (freguesias):

 Aguiar de Sousa
 Astromil
 Baltar
 Beire
 Cete
 Cristelo
 Duas Igrejas
 Gandra
 Lordelo
 Louredo
 Parada de Todeia
 Paredes
 Rebordosa
 Recarei
 Sobreira
 Sobrosa
 Vandoma
 Vilela

Notable people

Sport 

 António Araújo (1923–2001) a former footballer with 151 club caps and 9 for Portugal 
 Maria Helena Cunha (born 1943) a Portuguese gymnast, competed in 5 events at the 1960 Summer Olympics
 Jaime Pacheco (born 1958) a former footballer with 305 club caps and 25 for Portugal
 Rui Barros (born 1965) a Portuguese former footballer with 409 club caps and 36 for Portugal
 Adalberto Ribeiro (born 1969), known as Adalberto, a retired footballer with 380 club caps
 Ângelo Varela (born 1980) a Portuguese former footballer with over 480 club caps
 Mário Sérgio (born 1981) a Portuguese former footballer with over 450 club caps
 Pedro Ribeiro (born 1983) a Portuguese former footballer with 387 club caps
 Hélder Barbosa (born 1987) a Portuguese footballer with over 330 club caps and 1 for Portugal
 Fábio Pacheco (born 1988) a Portuguese footballer with over 300 club caps.
 Vasco Rocha (born 1989) a Portuguese footballer with over 350 club caps.

References

External links

 

 
Municipalities of Porto District